Areva trigemmis is a moth of the subfamily Arctiinae. It was described by Jacob Hübner in 1827. It is found in Mexico, Haiti and Espírito Santo, Brazil.

References

Moths described in 1827
Lithosiini
Moths of North America
Moths of South America